West End is an elevated rail station on the Red and Gold lines of the Metropolitan Atlanta Rapid Transit Authority (MARTA) rail system servicing the West End and most of Southwest Atlanta, including neighborhoods bordering Cascade Road and Metropolitan Parkway. The West End station opened on September 11, 1982.

This station provides access to The Mall at Westend and the Woodruff Library Shuttle to Clark Atlanta University.

Bus service is provided at this station to Westend Medical Center, Joel Chandler Harris Home (the Wren's Nest), Hammonds House, The Salvation Army Evangeline Booth College, The Salvation Army Ray and Joan Kroc Center Atlanta, Atlanta Technical College, Atlanta Metropolitan College, The Salvation Army Firecrest Missioners Center, Spelman College, Morehouse School of Medicine, Morehouse College,  Hapeville, Interdenominational Theological Center (ITC) and The Atlanta University Center.

Station layout

Bus routes

The station is served by the following MARTA bus routes:
 Route 1 - Marietta Blvd. / Joseph E Lowery Blvd.
 Route 40 - Peachtree Street / Downtown
 Route 58 - West Lake Avenue / Hollywood Road
 Route 68 - Benjamin E. Mays Drive
 Route 71 - Cascade Road
 Route 81 - Venetian Hills / Delowe Drive
 Route 94 - Northside Drive
 Route 95 - Metropolitan Parkway
 Route 155 - Pittsburgh
 Route 832 - Grant Park

Due to the Coronavirus Pandemic, MARTA is only providing service to routes 40, 71, and 95 until further notice.

References

External links
MARTA Station Page
nycsubway.org Atlanta page
 Station from Google Maps Street View

Gold Line (MARTA)
Red Line (MARTA)
Metropolitan Atlanta Rapid Transit Authority stations
Railway stations in the United States opened in 1982
Railway stations in Atlanta
1982 establishments in Georgia (U.S. state)